The Tsardom of Bulgaria was the name of the Bulgarian state from Simeon's assumption of the title of Tsar in 913 until the Fatherland Front's foundation of the People's Republic of Bulgaria in 1946.

It occurred in three distinct periods: between the 10th and 11th centuries, again between the 12th and 15th centuries, and finally in the 20th century. The first and the second Bulgarian Tsardoms are not treated as separate entities, but rather as one state restored after a period of Byzantine rule over its territory. But the third Bulgarian Tsardom was restored after a period of more than four centuries of Ottoman rule, and the government principles of the Medieval period can not be applicable, so it was treated as separate state, which is just a successor of the Medieval  Bulgarian Tsardoms.

While the title tsar was translated as "emperor" in the First and Second Bulgarian Empires, it was translated as "king" in modern Bulgarian language.

History
The Tsardom of Bulgaria is a continuation of the Bulgarian state founded in 681, actually the First Bulgarian Empire and the Tsardom of Bulgaria are one state.

It occurred in three distinct periods: between the 10th and 11th centuries, again between the 12th and 15th centuries, and again in the 20th century. The first and the second Bulgarian Tsardoms are not treated as separate entities, but rather as one state restored after a period of Byzantine rule over its territory. But the third Bulgarian Tsardom was restored after a period of more than four centuries of Ottoman rule, and the government principles of the Medieval period can not be applicable, so it was treated as separate state, which is just a successor of the Medieval Bulgarian Tsardoms.

History of Bulgaria
Former empires in Europe